The Volcano Disaster Assistance Program (VDAP) was developed by the U.S. Geological Survey and the United States Agency for International Development's Office of U.S. Foreign Disaster Assistance after the eruption of Nevado del Ruiz (Colombia) in 1985. The volcanic eruption melted a glacier triggering a lahar that killed 25,000 people. It was determined that increased monitoring and enhanced communications between scientists and civil authorities would make it easier to evacuate local populations and save lives. Today the program responds to volcanic crises around the world. The aim of the program is to assist in saving lives and property, to reduce economic losses, and to prevent a natural hazard becoming a natural disaster. VDAP staff members are based at the USGS Cascades Volcano Observatory, in Vancouver, Washington. VDAP channels its energy into four main activities: response to natural disaster, capacity building, training, and volcanological research.

Response
VDAP responds primarily to ‘non-domestic’ eruptions outside the United States.  Since 1986, the team has responded to over 70 major events around the world.  Scores of other  remote responses involve consultations with the relevant local observatories.  A subset of foreign responses are listed in the following table and on the map.

Preparation and Monitoring

Capacity building involves the development of education and monitoring in hazardous areas. The small group of scientists involved in the program work on eruption forecasting and assessing the hazards in volcanically active areas. This is usually carried out when there is not a crisis to work on.
This kind of work has been carried out in Central and South America since 1998, Papua New Guinea (1998-2000) and Indonesia since 2004.

Training

VDAP holds workshops and training courses around the world. Many of these involve remote sensing and Geographic information system (GIS) modelling. VDAP assists as part of CSAV (Center for the Study of Active Volcanism)  a six-week international  course in Hawaii and Vancouver, WA. The students include geologists, geochemists and geophysicists, who receive training in the science behind volcano monitoring.

Research

VDAP supports projects which improve the forecasting of eruptions or better characterize the effects of previous eruptions. Examples of this include research at Pinatubo and Chaitén Volcano, Chile.

References

External links

United States Geological Survey
Disaster management
Volcanology